Mian Khurram Jahangir Wattoo is a Pakistani politician who was a Member of the Provincial Assembly of the Punjab, from August 2013 to May 2018 and a member of the National Assembly of Pakistan from 2012 to 2013.

Early life
He was born on 25 February 1976 in Okara to former Chief Minister of the Punjab Manzoor Wattoo.

Political career
He was elected to the National Assembly of Pakistan as a candidate of Pakistan Peoples Party (PPP) from Constituency NA-147 (Okara-V) in by-polls held in 2012. He received 79,195 votes and defeated an independent candidate, Muhammad Zafar Yasin Wattoo.

He was elected to the Provincial Assembly of the Punjab as a candidate of PPP from Constituency PP-193 (Okara-IX) in by-polls held in August 2013.

References

Living people
1976 births
Pakistani MNAs 2008–2013
Punjab MPAs 2013–2018
Pakistan People's Party MNAs
Pakistan People's Party MPAs (Punjab)
Khurram Jahangir